Polyandry in India refers to the practice of polyandry, whereby a woman has two or more husbands at the same time, either historically on the Indian subcontinent or currently in the country of India. An early example can be found in the Hindu epic Mahabharata, in which Draupadi, daughter of the king of Panchala, is married to five brothers.

Polyandry was mainly prevalent in the Kinnaur Region, a part of Himachal in India which is close to the Tibet or currently the Indo-China border. As mentioned in the epic Mahabharata, the Pandavas were banished from their kingdom for thirteen years and they spent the last year hiding in this hilly terrain of Kinnaur. Some Kinaauris claim that this practice has been inherited from the Pandavas, who they identify as their ancestors . The Garhwali people similarly identify their practice of polyandry with their descent from the Pandavas.

Polyandry is also seen in South India among the Todas tribes of Nilgiris, Nanjanad Vellala of Travancore. While polyandrous unions have disappeared from the traditions of many of the groups and tribes, it is still practiced by some Paharis, especially in the Jaunsar-Bawar region in Northern India.

Recent years have seen the rise in fraternal polyandry in the agrarian societies in Malwa region of Punjab to avoid division of farming land.

Legal developments

Section 494 and 495 of the Indian Penal Code of 1860, prohibited polygamy for the Christians. In 1955, the Hindu Marriage Act was drafted, which prohibited marriage of a Hindu whose spouse was still living. Thus polygamy became illegal in India in 1956.

Kinnaur

Polyandry is in practice in many villages of Kinnaur district of Himachal Pradesh. Fraternal polyandry (where husbands are related to each other) is mainly in practice in villages, where the societies are male dominated and which still follow ancient rituals and customs.

There are many forms of polyandry which can be found here. Most often, all the brothers are married to a woman and sometimes the marriage to brothers happens at a later date. The wife can only ascertain the blood-relationship of the children, though recently there have been a few instances of paternity tests using DNA samples to resolve inheritance disputes. The rules for breaking the marriage are strict and a brother going against the marriage agreement can be treated as an outcast while losing his entire share in the property.

The territory of Kinnaur remained forbidden for many years as the land route was only established 30 years ago. The joint families are now fragmented into nuclear families. The level of economies and financial resources have transformed the life of the people of Kinnaur into city.

Toda

Todas are tribal people residing in the Nilgiri hills (Tamil Nadu) in South India who for several centuries practiced polyandry. They practiced a form of polyandrous relationship which is considered to be a classic example of polyandry. They practiced both fraternal and sequential polyandry.

The males who shared one or two wives were not always full or half-brothers. A Toda woman when married was automatically married to her husband's brothers. When the wife became pregnant, one husband would ceremonially give a bow and arrow to the wife, and would be the father of that child. When the next child arrived, same husband who performed that ceremony continues to be called father even though child is not biologically related to him, unless another husband would perform the ceremony and become the father.

Kerala
Polyandry and polygamy were prevalent in Kerala till the late 19th century and isolated cases were reported until the mid-20th century. Castes practicing polyandry were Nairs, Thiyyas

In the case of Nairs and other related castes, a man's property is inherited by his sister's children and not his own. Under Nair polyandry, the only conceivable blood-relationship could be ascertained through females. However, polyandry among Nairs is a contested issue with opinion divided between ones who support its existence and ones who do not support it based on the fact that no stable  relationship is formed in Nair polyandry. Ezhavas of Kerala also practised polyandry. The custom of fraternal polyandry was common among Thiyyas of Malabar. According to Cyriac Pullipally, some female members of the Thiyya community associated with English men as their concubines.

Punjab and Haryana
In certain areas of Punjab, especially the Bathinda and Mansa districts of Malwa region, poor farmers follow the practice of polyandry under economic compulsion to avoid further fragmentation of their already small landholdings. A study conducted in 2019 by Panjab University found evidence of polyandry in Haryana and Punjab. The study culminated in the book Gender Culture and Honour and found cases of wife sharing in the districts of Yamunanagar in Haryana and Mansa and Fatehgarh Sahib of Punjab.

Jaunsar-Bawar
Polyandry was practised in Jaunsar-Bawar in Uttarakhand. A distinct group of people called Paharis live in the lower ranges of Himalayas in Northern India from southeastern Kashmir all the way through Nepal. Polyandry has been reported among these people in many districts but studied in great detail in Jaunsar-Bawar. It is a region in Dehradun district in Uttarakhand. The practice is believed to have descended from their ancestors who had earlier settled down in the plains from Himalayas.

Polyandrous union occurs in this region when a woman marries the eldest son in a family. The woman automatically becomes the wife of all his brothers upon her marriage. The brothers can be married to more than one woman if the first woman was sterile or if the age difference of the brothers were large. The wife is shared equally by all brothers and no one in the group has exclusive privilege to the wife. The woman considers all the men in the group her husband and the children recognise them all as their father.

Other tribal peoples

Fraternal polyandry exists among the Khasa of Dehradun; the Mala Madessar, the Mavilan, etc. of Kerala. Non-fraternal polyandry exists among the Kota; and among the Karvazhi, Pulaya, Muthuvan, and Mannan in Kerala.

In the 1911 Census of India, E.A. Gait mentions polyandry of the Tibetans, Bhotias, Kanets of Kulu valley, people of state of Bashahr, Thakkars and Megs of Kashmir, Gonds of Central Provinces, Todas and Kurumbas of Nilgiris, Kallars of Madurai, Tolkolans of Malabar, Ezhavas, Kaniyans and Kammalans of Cochin, Muduvas of Travancore and of Nairs.

See also

Polygamy in India

References

Further reading
Manis Kumar Raha & Palash Chandra Coomar : Polyandry in India. Gian Publishing House, Delhi, 1987.

Marriage in India
India